Nadeem Sikander (born 12 December 1985) is a Pakistani cricketer. He made his first-class debut for Rawalpindi in the 2003–04 Quaid-e-Azam Trophy on 12 April 2004. He made his List A debut for Rawalpindi in the 2018–19 Quaid-e-Azam One Day Cup on 6 September 2018.

References

External links
 

1985 births
Living people
Pakistani cricketers
Place of birth missing (living people)
Rawalpindi cricketers